Profyle is an American R&B group, best known for their hit, "Liar". They were signed to Motown Records with which they released two albums and then went on to release another album independently.

Background
The group released their single titled "Liar", produced by Teddy Riley. The video for "Liar" was a staple of MTV2, VH1 and BET in the fall of 2000.

The group released a self-titled album in 2004 on Major Money. Profyle disbanded in 2004 after this album failed to chart. The lead singer went on to work with artists such as Gerald Levert, Shawn Kane, Gerald "CleanUp Man" Isaac, Scott Storch and Ne-Yo.

Discography
Studio
Whispers in the Dark (1999)
Nothin' But Drama (2000)
Profyle (2004)

References

American contemporary R&B musical groups
Musical groups from Louisiana
Musical groups established in 1995
Musical groups disestablished in 2004
Motown artists